The 2016–17 Gibraltar Premier Division (known as the Argus Insurance Premier Division for sponsorship reasons) was the 118th season of the national amateur and semi-professional football league in Gibraltar since its establishment - the highest level of football in Gibraltar. The league was contested by ten clubs, the top eight clubs from last season and two promoted clubs from 2015–16 Gibraltar Second Division. Lincoln Red Imps were the reigning champions, sealing a record 22nd title last season. The season began on 21 September 2016 and ended on 22 May 2017. Europa won the title, ending Lincoln's 14 title run and winning their first title since 1952.

Format
As with the previous season, each of the ten Premier Division teams played each other three times for a total of 27 matches each. The tenth-placed team was relegated while the ninth-placed team from the Premier Division entered a playoff with the second-placed team from the Second Division for a spot in the 2017–18 Premier Division.

Starting from this season, Gibraltar are granted two spots instead of one in the Europa League. The season also saw the introduction of a Home Grown Player (HGP) rule, forcing clubs in both of Gibraltar's divisions to have at least 3 Gibraltarian players in their matchday squads, with at least one on the field of play at all times.

Teams

After the previous season, Angels and Britannia XI were both relegated to the Second Division; Europa Point and Mons Calpe were promoted in their places.

Personnel and kits

Note: Flags indicate national team as has been defined under FIFA eligibility rules. Players may hold more than one non-FIFA nationality.

Managerial Changes

League table

Results

Matches 1–18
Teams played each other twice.

Matches 19–27
Teams played each other once.

Promotion/relegation play-off
At the end of the season, the ninth-placed team from the Premier Division will enter a play-off with the second-placed team from the Second Division for a spot in the 2017–18 Premier Division. FCB Magpies finished second in the Second Division after their win on May 8, 2017.

Top goalscorers

See also
2016–17 Gibraltar Second Division

References

External links
Season at soccerway.com
Gibraltar Football Association

Gibraltar Premier Division seasons
Gib
1